Historia von D. Johann Fausten, the first "Faust book", is a chapbook of stories concerning the life of Johann Georg Faust, written by an anonymous German author. It was published by Johann Spies (1540–1623) in Frankfurt am Main in 1587, and became the main source for the play The Tragical History of Doctor Faustus by Christopher Marlowe and Goethe's closet play Faust, and also served as the libretto of the opera by Alfred Schnittke, also entitled Historia von D. Johann Fausten.

The Faust Book seems to have been written during the latter half of the sixteenth century (1568–81 or shortly thereafter).  It comes down to us in manuscript from a professional scribe in Nuremberg and also as a 1587 imprint from the prominent Frankfurt publishing house of Johann Spies.

The better-known version is the Spies imprint of 1587.  It came out in September, was reprinted again in the same year and very frequently thereafter, each time with additional tales about Faust, usually old, known folktales with the superimposition of Faust's name.  In accord with the theological reputation and clientele of the Spies printing house, their 1587 imprint is also heavily larded with religious commentary.  Such "admonitions to the Christian reader" played so well that by the end of the century they had grown to become the major part of the (printed) Faust Books.  The general sloppiness and repetitiveness of all these additions, however, seems to have diminished the book's popularity in the long run.  As people became less disposed to religious controversy it ceased to be such an attractive book.

The manuscript version was eventually edited by H. G. Haile for the Erich Schmidt Verlag, 1960, and for Carl Winter Verlag, 1996. Haile also published a translation, The History of Dr. Johann Faustus (University of Illinois, 1965).

External links
The Historical Faustus / Der geschichtliche Faustus, in English and German
Excerpt page from the Wolfenbüttel Manuscript
 The Faust Book as translated from the Wolfenbüttel Manuscript.
 The Wolfenbüttel Manuscript, in German
Faust Legends 
Faust Legends

1587 books
Renaissance literature
German books
European folklore
Faust
Works based on the Faust legend
Chapbooks
German novels adapted into plays
Works published anonymously
de:Historia von D. Johann Fausten